Martin Kafando (born 24 April 1988) is a Burkinabé football defender.

References 

1988 births
Living people
Burkinabé footballers
Burkina Faso international footballers
US des Forces Armées players
Perak F.C. players
Association football defenders
Burkinabé expatriate footballers
Expatriate footballers in Malaysia
Burkinabé expatriate sportspeople in Malaysia
Malaysia Super League players
21st-century Burkinabé people